{{Infobox person
| name            = Sagar Puranik
| image           = 
| image_size      = 
| caption         = 
| birth_name      = 
| birth_date      = 
| birth_place     = Bhusawal, India
| alma_mater      = PES University
| occupation      = Actor, Model, Director
| years_active    = 1997 - present
| nationality     = 
| citizenship     = Indian
| notable_works   = Ring Road SumaMahaan Hutatma| father          = Suneel Puranik
| awards          = Special Mention Award in 66th NFA, 2019
| signature       = 
}}

Sagar Puranik is a National Award winning director and actor who predominantly works in Kannada film and Television industry. Sagar made his film debut with Ring Road Suma (2015), which is notable for, it was made by an all-women crew, the first in Kannada language

Early and personal life
Sagar was born in 1992. He has completed his PU from Jain University, Bengaluru and obtained his degree from PES University, Bengaluru.

Career
Sagar started his acting career when he was 5 years old with Nargund Baba Saheb'', a TV serial about freedom fighters from Karnataka and in TV serial Chirasmarane both by Doordarshan. Thereafter, a bi-lingual TV serial, titled Natyarani Shantala directed by G. V. Iyer. He appeared in TV serials titled Rajkumari directed by Shruthi Naidu for Zee Kannada, Anju Mallige in Kasturi Channel, Thangali and Madarangi for Udaya TV directed by B. Suresha, Mahasati for Udaya TV directed by Suneel Puranik. In 2015, Sagar acted in the hit film Ring Road Suma. His non-featured short film on Bhagat Singh won Special Mention Award in 66th National Film Awards, 2019.

Filmography

Awards

References

External links
 

1992 births
Indian male film actors
Indian television presenters
Indian male voice actors
Living people